Oklahoma Annie is a 1952 American Western film directed by R. G. Springsteen and written by Jack Townley and Charles E. Roberts. The film stars Judy Canova, John Russell, Grant Withers, Roy Barcroft, Emmett Lynn and Frank Ferguson. The film was released on March 24, 1952 by Republic Pictures.

Plot
General store owner Judy is fed up the crime in her county such as bank robbery and an illegal crooked gambling den that fleeces her two prospector friends. Taking after her grandmother, a western sheriff known as "Oklahoma Annie" to all, Judy manages to persuade new sheriff Dan Fraser to deputize her. After she helps capture bank robber Curt Walker, who's in cahoots with county supervisor Haskell, the sheriff feels confident enough in Judy to leave her in charge by herself while he rides to get the judge for Walker's trial.

Things instantly go wrong for Judy, whose shooting skills are so ineffective that she attempts to use fireworks instead. Walker gets away and Dan ends up in grave danger, but with all the men gone in a posse, Judy rounds up other women in town and together they ride to Dan's rescue in the guise of a volunteer fire department. After his rescue, Dan decides to take the county supervisor's job and appoints Judy as the new sheriff.

Cast 
   
Judy Canova as Judy Canova
John Russell as Dan Fraser
Grant Withers as Bull McCready
Roy Barcroft as Curt Walker
Emmett Lynn as Paydirt 
Frank Ferguson as Eldridge Haskell
Minerva Urecal as Mrs. Lottie Fling
Houseley Stevenson as Blinky
Almira Sessions as Mrs. Carrie Fudge
Allen Jenkins as Lou 
Maxine Gates as Tillie
Emory Parnell as Judge Byrnes
Denver Pyle as Skip
House Peters, Jr. as Jim Tullett
Andrew Tombes as Mayor of Eureka
Fuzzy Knight as Larry
Si Jenks as Old Man

References

External links 
 

1952 films
American Western (genre) comedy films
1952 comedy films
Republic Pictures films
Films directed by R. G. Springsteen
Films scored by Nathan Scott
Trucolor films
1952 Western (genre) films
1950s English-language films
1950s American films